Matusevich can refer to:

People
Eduard Matusevich (1937 —), Soviet speed skater
Helen Matusevich Oujesky (1930 – 2010), American professor of microbiology 
Konstantin Matusevich (1971 —), Israeli high jumper
Laura Matusevich, Argentine mathematician
Nikolai Alexandrovich Matusevich (1852 — 1912), Russian vice admiral
Nikolai Nikolayevich Matusevich (1879 — 1950), Soviet Arctic researcher
Yan Matusevich (1946 — 1998),  Belarusian Catholic priest

Places
Matusevich Fjord, Severnaya Zemlya, Russia
Matusevich Glacier, Antarctica